Nicholas Allievi (born 20 April 1992) is an Italian footballer who plays as a defender for  club Rimini.

Career
Born in Varese, Lombardy, Allievi started his career at Lombard club Varese. At 16 years old he was signed by serie B club, AlbinoLeffe.

In July 2011 he was signed by Lega Pro Prima Divisione club FeralpiSalò in co-ownership deal. In June 2012 Allievi returned to AlbinoLeffe.

In July 2015 he was signed definirlo By FeralpiSaló in serie C.

In January 2017 he signed with Juve Stabia in Serie C, where in 2018/2019 he won the Serie C championship playing as a starter, scoring 2 goals and injuring his knee in April 2019. 

In November 2019 he returned from the accident and played in Serie B with Juve Stabia.

In January 2021 he signed with Como. and won the Serie C championship and injured the Achilles tendon.

On 28 January 2022 he joined Cesena until the end of the season.

On 8 July 2022, he signed with Rimini.

References

External links
 AIC profile (data by football.it) 
 

1992 births
Living people
Footballers from Lombardy
Sportspeople from Varese
Italian footballers
Association football defenders
Serie B players
Serie C players
U.C. AlbinoLeffe players
FeralpiSalò players
S.S. Juve Stabia players
Como 1907 players
Cesena F.C. players
Rimini F.C. 1912 players